Mstyora (or Mstera) miniature is a Russian folk handicraft of miniature painting, which is done with tempera paints on varnished articles mostly made of papier-mâché.

Mstyora miniatures appeared in the settlement of Mstyora (in modern Vladimir Oblast) in the early 20th century on the basis of a local tradition of icon-painting. In 1923, Mstyora painters formed an artel called Ancient Russian Folk Painting (Древнерусская народная живопись), renamed Proletarian Art (Пролетарское искусство) in 1931. This artel was turned into a factory in 1960. The Mstyora painting technology was borrowed from the Palekh artists.

Mstyora miniatures usually represent characters from real life, folklore, and literary and historical works. Warmth and gentleness of colors, depth of landscape backgrounds (often with blue dales in the back), small size and squatness of human figurines, and subtlety of framing pattern done in gold are typical.

References 

Russian handicrafts
Miniature painting
Papier-mâché
Vladimir Oblast
20th-century establishments in Russia